"Bang It Out" is a song by American electronic music group Breathe Carolina. The song features American pop duo, Karmin. It was released digitally on March 18, 2014 as the third single from their fourth studio album Savages. "Bang It Out" was sent to US dance radio on July 1, 2014 by Fearless Records.

Background and composition
"Bang It Out" was written by Ian Kirkpatrick, Lindy Robbins, David Schmitt, Kyle Even, Luis Bonet, Eric Armenta and Joshua Aragon while Kirkpatrick also handled the production of the song. The track runs at 130 BPM and is in the key of A-sharp minor. The song was featured in the 2014 film soundtrack Earth to Echo. The group also released several remixes to the song in 2014.

Music video
The band released a teaser video for "Bang It Out" on April 16, 2014. The music video was officially released on May 6 and was directed by Drew Russ.

Track listing

Charts

Release history

References

2014 singles
2014 songs
Fearless Records singles
Breathe Carolina songs
Songs written by Ian Kirkpatrick (record producer)
Song recordings produced by Ian Kirkpatrick (record producer)